Sawao (written: 沢男 or さわお in hiragana) is a masculine Japanese given name. Notable people with the name include:

, Japanese gymnast
, Japanese musician

Japanese masculine given names